Virginia's 17th House of Delegates district elects one of 100 seats in the Virginia House of Delegates, the lower house of the state's bicameral legislature. District 17 represents part of the city of Roanoke as well as parts of Botetourt and Roanoke counties. The seat is currently held by Republican Christopher T. Head.

District officeholders

Electoral history

References

Virginia House of Delegates districts
Roanoke, Virginia
Roanoke County, Virginia
Botetourt County, Virginia